Daltrey may refer to:
 Roger Daltrey (born 1944), English singer and actor
 Daltrey (album), 1973
 Daltrey (surname)